The New England Women's Hockey Alliance (NEWHA) is a women's college ice hockey conference in the United States. It participates in the NCAA's Division I as a hockey-only conference. As of the current 2022–23 season, the conference is made up of seven teams, with two each in Connecticut and New Hampshire, and one each in Massachusetts, New York, and Vermont. An eighth school in Massachusetts joined for administrative purposes in 2022, but will not start conference play until 2023.

History
Prior to 2017, the women's ice hockey program at Sacred Heart University was a longstanding independent team, part of no conference. In that year, three NCAA Division II colleges and one Division I college (College of the Holy Cross) were removed from their NCAA Division III hockey conference (the New England Hockey Conference, formerly the ECAC East). Those teams had previously not been eligible for postseason play, but the conference no longer wanted Division I and II teams playing a conference schedule at all. A sixth team, from Post University, announced plans to start playing that year as well.

Sacred Heart, Post, and the other four programs (Holy Cross, St. Michael's, St. Anselm, and Franklin Pierce) then formed a scheduling alliance called the New England Women's Hockey Alliance. This was not a formal conference affiliation, just an agreement among the teams to schedule each other during the regular season; officially the teams would be classified as Division I or Division II independents. (NCAA women's ice hockey makes no distinction between Divisions I and II; the NCAA operates a single National Collegiate Championship for women's hockey that includes both Division I and Division II teams, and scholarship limits in that sport are identical in both divisions.)

Holy Cross intended to be independent only for one season, applying for and gaining membership in Hockey East effective 2018. In that year, the other NEWHA members announced plans to adhere to Division I recruiting rules and offer scholarships, and so applied to the NCAA for the NEWHA to be recognized as an official Division I conference. They also announced the conference would include Long Island University's team when it began play in 2019. NEWHA was approved as a Division I NCAA conference in September 2019. The conference will need to play at least two seasons with the same six members before being granted an automatic bid to the National Collegiate Championship playoffs in women's ice hockey.

The NEWHA expanded to seven members in 2022 with the arrival of Stonehill College, which started a varsity women's hockey team in the 2022–23 season. Stonehill had initially planned to start play in 2021–22, but NCAA-imposed recruiting limits imposed in the wake of COVID-19 led the school to delay the team's start by a year. The latest addition to the NEWHA is Assumption University, which joined for administrative purposes on July 1, 2022 in advance of its first season of varsity play in 2023–24.

On February 22, 2020, Saint Anselm and Franklin Pierce broke the record for longest NCAA women's hockey game with a five-overtime contest in the NEWHA Playoff Tournament that went 147:24. The game eclipsed the previous record of 144:32 in a 2010 game featuring RPI and Quinnipiac.

Members

Current members

Future member

Former member

Membership timeline

Champions

See also 
 NCAA Women's Ice Hockey Tournament (National Collegiate division)

References

2017 establishments in the United States
Ice hockey in New England
Ice hockey in New York (state)
NCAA Division I ice hockey conferences
New England Women's Hockey Alliance